The Elizabeth Garrett Anderson and Obstetric Hospital and its predecessor organisations provided health care to women in central London from the mid-Victorian era. It was named after Elizabeth Garrett Anderson, one of Britain's first female physicians, and its work continues in the modern Elizabeth Garrett Anderson wing of University College Hospital, part of UCLH NHS Foundation Trust.

History

In 1866, Elizabeth Garrett Anderson, with financial backing from her father, founded and became General Medical Attendant to St Mary's Dispensary in Seymour Place, where she worked for over 20 years. This dispensary developed into the New Hospital for Women in 1872.  It was established to enable poor women to obtain medical help from qualified female practitioners - in that era a very unusual thing. In 1874 it moved to Marylebone Road, on a site now occupied by The Landmark Hotel. The foundation stone for new purpose-built facilities in Euston Road was laid by the Princess of Wales in 1889. The architect was J. M. Brydon, who took into his employment at this time Anderson's sister Agnes Garrett and her cousin Rhoda Garrett, who contributed to its design. The hospital was renamed the Elizabeth Garrett Anderson Hospital in 1918, in the year following the death of the pioneer physician.

In 1946 the hospital purchased the Hampstead Nursing Home at 40 Belsize Grove (close to Belsize Park Underground station). Between 1948 and 1977 the property in Belsize Grove was known as the Garrett Anderson Maternity Home. The building was subsequently demolished and replaced by residential accommodation.

The Elizabeth Garrett Anderson hospital in Euston Road was under threat of closure from the 1960s and closure was announced in 1976 by Camden Area Health Authority. In November that year the building was occupied by the staff. Campaigning continued until 1979.

In January 2001 the Elizabeth Garrett Anderson Hospital amalgamated with the Obstetric Hospital to form the Elizabeth Garrett Anderson and Obstetric Hospital: it moved to Huntley Street at the same time.

In November 2008, the hospital's maternity and neonatal services moved to the new University College Hospital Elizabeth Garrett Anderson Wing, a £70 million purpose-built wing offering the latest technology and facilities, and the old building in Huntley Street was demolished to make room for the UCH Macmillan Cancer Centre, which opened in April 2012.

Elizabeth Garrett Anderson Gallery
The 1890 core of the former Elizabeth Garrett Anderson Hospital building in Euston Road has been listed and, restored, now forms part of the UNISON Centre. Within this building the Elizabeth Garrett Anderson Gallery is open to the public. The gallery is a permanent installation and uses a variety of media to tell the story of Elizabeth Garrett Anderson, her hospital, and women's struggle to achieve equality in the field of medicine within the wider framework of 19th and 20th century social history. Interactive displays allow the visitor to discover more about the "Enterprising Women" who followed Elizabeth Garrett into the medical profession – and into other spheres of British public life.

See also 
 London School of Medicine for Women
 South London Hospital for Women and Children
 List of hospitals in England

References

Further reading

External links
 UCLH - Our hospitals - University College Hospital Elizabeth Garrett Anderson Wing, uclh.nhs.uk; accessed 6 May 2015.
Lost Hospitals of London: Garrett Anderson  Maternity Home, 40 Belsize Grove, Hamsptead, NW3 4TS, ezitis.myzen.co.uk; accessed 6 May 2015.

Hospital buildings completed in 1890
Hospitals established in 1866
University College London Hospitals NHS Foundation Trust
Buildings and structures in the London Borough of Camden
Organisations based in London with royal patronage
Defunct hospitals in London
Maternity hospitals in the United Kingdom
Buildings and structures in Bloomsbury
1866 establishments in England
Hospitals disestablished in 2008
2008 disestablishments in England
Unison (trade union)
Dispensaries in London